Fudge Farm is a historical farmhouse and property located just east of Surgoinsville, Tennessee, United States. An I-house, it was completed around 1851 and was built by slave labor for local planter Conrad Fudge, who had recently moved to the area from Virginia. Fudge Farm is still in use and privately owned. Aside from the house, the property also has a stock barn, a granary, smokehouse and a well house.

References

Houses on the National Register of Historic Places in Tennessee
Houses completed in 1851
Hawkins County, Tennessee
Houses in Hawkins County, Tennessee
Farms on the National Register of Historic Places in Tennessee
Slavery in the United States
1851 establishments in Tennessee
National Register of Historic Places in Hawkins County, Tennessee